Willie Deane (born February 23, 1980) is an American-Bulgarian former professional basketball player. Deane has won three Bulgarian championships, one Bulgarian Cup, a French championship, a French Super Cup and an Italian championship.

College career
Dean played high school basketball at Schenectady High School, in Schenectady, New York. He played college basketball at Boston College for one season before transferring to Purdue University to complete his final three years of eligibility.

Professional career
In 2008, Deane became a household name in European Basketball when he signed a contract with Zalgiris rumored to be excess of $600,000.

In June 2012, Deane signed with Ukrainian team BC Khimik.

Deane signed with BC Krasny Oktyabr for the 2013–14 season.

On May 12, 2014, he signed with Emporio Armani Milano of the Italian Lega Basket Serie A for the rest of the 2013–14 season.

On September 19, 2014, Deane signed with Pallacanestro Varese. On February 27, 2015, he left Varese and returned to his former team Krasny Oktyabr for the rest of the season.

On November 5, 2015, Deane signed with STB Le Havre of the French LNB Pro A. In March 2016, he left Le Havre and signed with Latvian club Ventspils for the rest of the season. On July 26, 2016, he re-signed with Ventspils for the 2016–17 season.

On June 16, 2017, Deane signed with French club Châlons-Reims for the 2017–18 season.

References

External links
Eurobasket.com profile
Euroleague.net profile
FIBA.com profile
DraftExpress.com profile

1980 births
Living people
American expatriate basketball people in Bulgaria
American expatriate basketball people in France
American expatriate basketball people in Greece
American expatriate basketball people in Italy
American expatriate basketball people in Latvia
American expatriate basketball people in Lithuania
American expatriate basketball people in Poland
American expatriate basketball people in Russia
American expatriate basketball people in Ukraine
American men's basketball players
Basketball players from New York (state)
BC Krasny Oktyabr players
BC Odesa players
BC Spartak Primorye players
BK Ventspils players
BC Žalgiris players
Boston College Eagles men's basketball players
Bulgarian men's basketball players
Bulgarian expatriate basketball people in France
Bulgarian expatriate basketball people in the United States
CB Estudiantes players
Champagne Châlons-Reims Basket players
Ilysiakos B.C. players
Liga ACB players
Olimpia Milano players
Pallacanestro Varese players
PBC Academic players
Point guards
Purdue Boilermakers men's basketball players
SLUC Nancy Basket players
Sportspeople from Schenectady, New York
STB Le Havre players
Türk Telekom B.K. players
Virtus Bologna players